Šútovský vodopad is a waterfall in Slovakia located in the Malá Fatra mountains,  north of the town of Šútovo.

References

Waterfalls of Slovakia